Kushkul (Quşkül) is a rural locality (a village) in Tavtimanovsky Selsoviet, Iglinsky District, Bashkortostan, Russia. The population was 33 as of 2010. There is 1 street.

Geography 
Kushkul is located 17 km northeast of Iglino (the district's administrative centre) by road. Peschano-Lyubovo is the nearest rural locality.

References 

Rural localities in Iglinsky District